= Oscar Byrne =

British ballet master

- Born: 1795?
- Died: 4 September 1867
- Occupation: Ballet master

Oscar Byrne (1795? – 4 September 1867) was a British ballet master.

== Biography ==
Byrne was the son of James Byrne, an actor and a ballet master. His first appearance, according to one authority, was made in 1803 at Drury Lane Theatre in a ballet arranged by his father from 'Ossian,' and called 'Oscar and Elwina,' which had been first presented twelve years previously at Covent Garden. A second authority states that he played his first part at Covent Garden 16 November 1803 as Cheerly in Hoare's 'Lock and Key.' Much of Byrne's early life was passed abroad or in Ireland. In 1850 Charles Kean, in his memorable series of performances at the Princess's Theatre, engaged Oscar Byrne, who arranged the ballets for the principal revivals. In 1862 Byrne went to Drury Lane, then under Falconer and Chatterton. His last engagement was at Her Majesty's Theatre, when Mr. Falconer produced his ill-starred drama of 'Oonah.' In his own line Byrne showed both invention and resource. He died rather suddenly on 4 September 1867 at the reputed age of seventy-two, leaving a young wife and seven children.
